

General Erwin Vierow (15 May 1890 – 1 February 1982) was a general in the Wehrmacht of Nazi Germany during World War II.

Between the wars he served on the General Staff of the Reichswehr and in the infantry and by the outbreak of World War II he had reached the rank of Generalmajor in the Wehrmacht. In August 1940 was appointed as commander of the 9th Infantry Division. Serving on the Eastern Front as commander of 55th Army Corps he became the military commandant of the city of Kharkov upon its capture on 24 October 1941. He was awarded the Knight's Cross of the Iron Cross on November 15, 1941.

On 1 July 1943 he was appointed commander of the army in northwest France, covering the regions of Laon, Orléans and Rouen and held this command until September 1944 when he was appointed chief of the ad hoc ‘General Command Somme’. He held this post until he surrendered to the British forces.

Awards 

 Knight's Cross of the Iron Cross on 15 November 1941 as General der Infanterie and commanding general of the LV. ArmeekorpsWound Badge

References

Citations

Bibliography

 

1890 births
1982 deaths
Military personnel from Berlin
German Army generals of World War II
Generals of Infantry (Wehrmacht)
German Army personnel of World War I
Prussian Army personnel
Recipients of the Knight's Cross of the Iron Cross
People from the Province of Brandenburg
Reichswehr personnel